Sky Midnight News is a news strand that airs every day on Sky News and on Sky News HD in the UK. The first 30–35 minutes of each hour features a round-up of the news stories and a look ahead to the morning news. The back half hour is typically filled by a re-transmission of the previous evening's Press Preview.

Broadcasts 

On weekdays, the format is used from midnight until 3 am and is followed by Sky World News. The slot is regularly presented by Kimberley Leonard. On weekends, the 2 am-3 am hour is usually filled by a documentary.

The Midnight News was once a 30-minute newscast branded individually from other hours in the schedule and was the only news programme in its time slot in the UK, however the programme now falls under general Sky News branding.

Presenters

Since joining Sky News in 2015, Kimberley Leonard is the primary anchor for the programme, typically anchoring most Monday-Thursday programmes. However since December 2020, following wider Sky News presenter movements, Leonard has been absent from the slot whilst covering other programmes across the weekday and weekend schedule.

External links
 IMDb

References

2010 British television series debuts
2020s British television series
Sky News
Sky UK original programming
British television news shows
Sky television news shows